Rubens Vieira Torres, (born in Imperatriz, Brazil) is a Brazilian footballer.

His former teams are: APOEL in Cyprus, Club de Regatas Vasco da Gama, Madureira Esporte Clube, Clube 15 de Novembro, Goiás Esporte Clube, America Football Club (RJ) and Sampaio Corrêa.

Rubens made 27 competitive appearances for CR Vasco da Gama.

Between 2015 and 2019, Rubens played for Imperatriz, a Brazilian club in the state of Maranhão, winning the title of Maranhão champion in 2015.

In 2021, Rubens agrees with Tocantinópolis, a Brazilian club from the state of Tocantins, to compete in the Brazilian championship series D.

References

1984 births
Living people
Brazilian footballers
Brazilian expatriate footballers
Cypriot First Division players
APOEL FC players
Clube 15 de Novembro players
CR Vasco da Gama players
Madureira Esporte Clube players
Goiás Esporte Clube players
América Futebol Clube (RN) players
Expatriate footballers in Cyprus
Association football midfielders
People from Imperatriz
Sportspeople from Maranhão